Robert Taylor Halliday (born 7 May 1932) was an eminent Anglican priest in the second half of the 20th century 

He was educated at the High School of Glasgow and the University of Glasgow (he gained a Master of Arts {MA} and a Bachelor of Divinity {BD}) and ordained in 1958. He held curacies at  St Andrew's, St Andrews and St Margaret's, Newlands before a 20-year stint as Rector of the Church of the Holy Cross, Davidson's Mains. He then returned to St Andrews as a Lecturer in Biblical studies at its university and Rector of the parish church- posts he held until his elevation to the episcopate  as Bishop of Brechin in 1990. He resigned his see in 1997, as he reached the clerical retirement age.

References

1932 births
People educated at the High School of Glasgow
Alumni of the University of Glasgow
Academics of the University of St Andrews
Bishops of Brechin (Episcopalian)
20th-century Scottish Episcopalian bishops
Living people